The Prophecy is a 1995 horror film.

The Prophecy may also refer to:

Music
The Prophecy (reggae band), a seggae music band from Mauritius
 The Prophecy (band), a progressive doom metal band from Yorkshire in England
 The Prophecy (Death Vomit album), 2006
 The Prophecy (Defiance album), 2009
 The Prophecy (Steed Lord album), an album by the Icelandic group Steed Lord
The Prophecy (Stigmata of the Immaculate), an album by the Canadian death metal band Kataklysm
 The Prophecy (Thunderlip album), 2007
 The Prophecy: Live in Europe, 2013 album by Painkiller 
 The Prophecy (Ninja Sex Party album), 2020
 "The Prophecy", a song by heavy metal band Iron Maiden, from their 1988 album Seventh Son of a Seventh Son
 "The Prophecy", a song by new wave band The Network, from their 2020 album Money Money 2020 Part II: We Told Ya So!
 "The Prophecy", a song from Music of The Lord of the Rings film series
 "The Prophecy", a song by the rapper Immortal Technique from the album Revolutionary Vol. 1

Print media
The Prophecy (Kuzneski novel), a novel by Chris Kuzneski
The Prophecy (Applegate novel), the thirty-fourth book in the Animorphs book series

Television
"The Prophecy" (Alias), the 16th episode of Alias
 "The Prophecy: Celebrity Deathmatch", an episode of Celebrity Deathmatch
"The Prophecy", an episode in Teen Titans fourth season
"The Prophecy Unleashed", episode 20 of Mysticons

Other uses
 The Prophecy (film series), a film franchise based in the 1995 film
The Prophecy (professional wrestling), a heel stable in Ring of Honor
The Prophecy (video game)

See also 
 Prophecy (disambiguation)